The Arakan National Party (abbreviated ANP), is a political party in Myanmar (Burma), representing the interests of the Rakhine people in Rakhine State and Yangon Region. The party was founded on 13 January 2014 and registered with the Union Election Commission on 6 March 2014. The chairman of the ANP is Thar Htun Hla. The party is known for its hardline ethnic nationalist stance, as well as its Islamophobic and anti-Rohingya positions. Some members of the party were involved in instigating violence against Rohingya people during the communal riots in 2012, which left dozens dead and thousands homeless.

History
The Rakhine Nationalities Development Party (RNDP), led by Dr. Aye Maung, and the Arakan League for Democracy (ALD), led by Aye Thar Aung, signed an agreement on 17 June 2013 to merge into a single party under the name "Arakan National Party" after more than eight months of negotiations.

In the 2015 general election, the party contested 63 seats in Rakhine State, Chin State, Ayeyarwady Region, and Yangon Region. The party won 10 seats in the Amyotha Hluttaw, 12 in the Pyithu Hluttaw, 22 in the Rakhine State Hluttaw, and one party member became an Ethnic Affairs Minister.

Former leaders of the ALD announced on 8 January 2017 that they were splitting from the ANP and were re-registering with the Union Election Commission for the 2020 elections, citing internal issues and RNDP dominance in the ANP as the reasons for the split.

On 27 November 2017, Dr. Aye Maung tendered his resignation from the party as chairman and member, citing persistent conflicts within the top ranks of the party.

References

Political parties in Myanmar
Political parties of minorities
Far-right politics in Myanmar
Buddhist political parties
Nationalist parties in Asia
2014 establishments in Myanmar
Political parties established in 2014
Right-wing politics in Myanmar
Right-wing parties